Friezland Railway Station served the Hamlet of Friezland in Saddleworth until closure on 1 January 1917. It was built by the London and North Western Railway on its Micklehurst Line.

Both train crew were killed.

The station closed for passenger traffic on 1 January 1917 but regular passenger traffic continued to pass through until 1964. Freight services to the station were withdrawn in 1965 and the line through the station was closed in 1966. The village is now served by Greenfield railway station.

References

The Manchester and Leeds Railway by Martin Bairstow

Disused railway stations in the Metropolitan Borough of Oldham
Former London and North Western Railway stations
Railway stations in Great Britain opened in 1886
Railway stations in Great Britain closed in 1917
Saddleworth